Alfred Kendricks Smith (December 13, 1903 – August 11, 1995) was a Major League Baseball pitcher who played in one game for the New York Giants on June 18, 1926. He pitched in two innings, and allowed two earned runs for an ERA of 9.00 in the Giants' 8–3 loss to the Pittsburgh Pirates.

He died on August 11, 1995, aged 91.

References

External links

1903 births
1995 deaths
Major League Baseball pitchers
Baseball players from Pennsylvania
New York Giants (NL) players
Los Angeles Angels (minor league) players